Launched in 2000, after earlier product lines including "Oracle Mail" and "Oracle InterOffice", the Oracle Collaboration Suite was software by Oracle Corporation for enterprise collaboration, a database-driven communications and messaging application platform with uses similar to Microsoft Exchange.  The Suite is used internally by Oracle and sold to customers.  Initially marketed as a unified messaging system, features were later added, including:
 Real Time Collaboration
 Instant messaging
 Web conferencing
 Desktop sharing
 Unified messaging
 eMail
 Voicemail
 Fax
 Telephony
 Wireless and voice access
 Microsoft Outlook integration
 Calendaring
 Content Management
 Files

 Records Management

The last full release of Oracle Collaboration Suite 10g was v10.1.2 of 2005; patches for it were later released.

The Suite was superseded in 2008 by Oracle Beehive.

References

External links
Butler Report at oracle.com

Oracle software